Pascale St-Onge (born May 13, 1977) is a Canadian politician who was elected to represent the riding of Brome—Missisquoi  in the House of Commons of Canada in the 2021 Canadian federal election.

She lives in Orford, Quebec.

She was appointed to cabinet as Minister of Sport and Minister responsible for the Economic Development Agency of Canada for the Regions of Quebec in 2021, becoming Canada's first openly lesbian cabinet minister.

Electoral record

Notes

References

External links

Living people
Members of the House of Commons of Canada from Quebec
Liberal Party of Canada MPs
Women members of the House of Commons of Canada
21st-century Canadian politicians
21st-century Canadian women politicians
People from Estrie
Trade unionists from Quebec
Canadian women trade unionists
Université de Montréal alumni
Université du Québec à Montréal alumni
Members of the 29th Canadian Ministry
Women government ministers of Canada
Members of the King's Privy Council for Canada
Canadian LGBT Members of Parliament
Lesbian politicians
1977 births
21st-century Canadian LGBT people